Rosemary Lane is the seventh album by contemporary British folk musician Bert Jansch, released in 1971. The sleeve was designed by Heather Jansch.

Track listing

References

Bert Jansch albums
1971 albums
Albums produced by Bill Leader
Transatlantic Records albums